Briel may refer to:

Places
 Briel (parish), a parish in the municipality of Buggenhout and the sub-municipality of Baasrode in the town Dendermonde in Flanders
 Brielle, a town in the Netherlands

Surname
 Jonatan Briel, a German director, screenplay author, and actor
 Dick Briel